Bineta Diouf (born 13 November 1978 in Rufisque, Dakar) is a Senegalese women's basketball player. A member of the Senegal women's national basketball team, Diouf competed with the squad at the 2000 Summer Olympics as well as later tournaments, including the 2008 FIBA World Olympic Qualifying Tournament.

References

1978 births
Living people
People from Rufisque
Senegalese women's basketball players
Olympic basketball players of Senegal
Basketball players at the 2000 Summer Olympics
African Games gold medalists for Senegal
African Games medalists in basketball
Competitors at the 2007 All-Africa Games